Valday or Valdai may refer to one of the following:
Valdai Hills, an upland region in Russia
Valdai Discussion Club
Valday (inhabited locality), name of several inhabited localities in Russia
Lake Valdayskoye (or Lake Valdai), a lake in Novgorod Oblast, Russia
Valday (ship), a class of Russian freight ships